William Fernando Souza Bezerra (born 20 September 1984) is a Brazilian former professional boxer who held the WBA Fedelatin cruiserweight title from 2012 to 2013. In addition, he held WBA Fedebol, WBC Mundo Hispano and South American titles in the same weight class. At one point he was ranked the fourth-best cruiserweight in the world by the WBA.

He amassed an amateur record of 96–2 (68 KO), and subsequently won the interim Brazilian cruiserweight title in his professional debut in 2010. His only non-knockout victory of his career came later that year when he defeated Hierro Salcedo by disqualification in his fifteenth bout.

Professional boxing record

| style="text-align:center;" colspan="8"|42 fights, 42 wins (41 knockouts, 1 disqualification), 0 loss (0 knockout)
|-  style="text-align:center; background:#e3e3e3;"
|  style="border-style:none none solid solid; "|Res.
|  style="border-style:none none solid solid; "|Record
|  style="border-style:none none solid solid; "|Opponent
|  style="border-style:none none solid solid; "|Type
|  style="border-style:none none solid solid; "|Rd., Time
|  style="border-style:none none solid solid; "|Date
|  style="border-style:none none solid solid; "|Location
|  style="border-style:none none solid solid; "|Notes
|- align=center
|Win
|42-0
|align=left| Francisco Marcelo Duarte Sobrinho
|
|
|
|align=left|
|align=left|
|- align=center
|Win
|41-0
|align=left| Romildo Dos Santos
|
|
|
|align=left|
|align=left|
|- align=center
|Win
|40-0
|align=left| Austreberto Perez Maranon
|
|
|
|align=left|
|align=left|
|- align=center

References

External links
 

1984 births
Living people
Cruiserweight boxers
Brazilian male boxers
Sportspeople from São Paulo